Mbewuleni is a remote village in the Sakhisizwe Local Municipality of the Eastern Cape in South Africa.  Its primary claim to fame is as the birthplace of former president Thabo Mbeki.

References 

Populated places in the Sakhisizwe Local Municipality